Jean-Claude Bagot (born 9 March 1958) is a French former  professional cyclist. He raced professionally between the years of 1983 and 1994. He is most known for winning one stage in the 1987 Giro d'Italia and winning the general classification in the 1984 Tour Méditerranéen. He also competed in a total of 17 Grand Tours, including nine editions of the Tour de France, three of the Giro d'Italia and five of the Vuelta a España. His best finish was ninth overall in the 1989 Vuelta a España.

His son, Yoann, also competed as a professional cyclist, but retired in 2019.

Major results

1984
 1st  Overall Tour Méditerranéen
1st Stage 3
 1st Stage 1 Étoile des Espoirs
 3rd Overall Tour d'Armorique
 6th Overall GP du Midi-Libre
 8th Grand Prix de Mauléon-Moulins
 9th Overall Critérium International
 10th Overall Paris–Nice
1985
 2nd Polynormande
 9th Overall GP du Midi-Libre
 10th Overall Setmana Catalana de Ciclisme
1986
 2nd Overall Setmana Catalana de Ciclisme
 3rd Road race, National Road Championships
 4th Overall Critérium du Dauphiné Libéré
 5th Subida a Arrate
 8th Overall GP du Midi-Libre
1987
 1st Stage 6 Giro d'Italia
 1st Stage 8b Volta a Catalunya
 2nd GP Ouest France-Plouay
 6th Overall Paris–Nice
1st Stage 6
1988
 9th Overall Tour of the Basque Country
1989
 9th Overall Vuelta a España
1990
 3rd Polynormande

References

French male cyclists
1958 births
Living people
French Giro d'Italia stage winners
Sportspeople from Manche
Cyclists from Normandy
20th-century French people
21st-century French people